Stéphane Préfontaine (born c. 1961) is a Canadian track athlete best known for co-lighting the Olympic Flame with Sandra Henderson at the 1976 Summer Olympics in Montreal.

Biography
Préfontaine attempted to compete in the athletics competition for Canada at the 1984 Summer Olympics in Los Angeles, but abandoned his dream after suffering tendon injuries.

He later earned his law degree from the University of Montreal, then a Masters of Law from Columbia University in New York New York in the United States. After his law degrees, Préfontaine studied philosophy and political science in France at the Institut d’Études Politiques de Paris (Institute of Political Studies of Paris in French), earning a first year doctorate. While practising law, he also earned a Master of Business Administration in finance at McGill University in Montreal.

Préfontaine started his law practice in 1989 before going into venture capital in 2004. That same year he was part of the 2004 Summer Olympics torch relay when it returned to Montreal.

References 

1961 births
Sciences Po alumni
Canadian businesspeople
Canadian lawyers
Columbia Law School alumni
Living people
McGill University Faculty of Management alumni
Olympic cauldron lighters
Canadian male track and field athletes